.303 may refer to:
 .303 British, a rifle cartridge
 .303 Savage, a rifle cartridge
 Lee–Enfield rifle
 .303 (film), a short film